Wang Ning (born 11 July 1964) is a former Chinese news anchor for China Central Television, the main state announcer of China.

Wang is known all over China as an announcer for the 7:00 pm CCTV News program Xinwen Lianbo, which serves China on various domestic and international networks. It is one of the most watched news programs in the world.

Biography
Wang was born in Qingdao, Shandong in 1964. After graduating from Communication University of China, he was assigned to China Central Television to host Xinwen Lianbo.

Personal life
Wang is married to the actress and host, Liu Chunyan. They have a daughter, Wang Yichen.

References

1964 births
People from Qingdao
Communication University of China alumni
Renmin University of China alumni
Living people
CCTV newsreaders and journalists